Jack James Blake (born 22 September 1994) is a professional footballer who currently plays for USL Championship side Indy Eleven. Born in England, he has represented Scotland at youth level.

Career

Nottingham Forest

Blake started his football career at the Notts County youth level before joining neighbours, Nottingham Forest at youth level from the under-10's team through to the club's academy. In May 2012, Blake was awarded his first professional contract with the club. Blake then made a first team breakthrough when he was included in the bench for the senior team for the club's home game against Peterborough United on 12 January 2013.

Blake was loaned for a month to county rivals, Mansfield Town on 19 October 2013. He made his professional debut on 22 October 2013 during a 0–0 draw against Bury. After making his professional debut, Blake expressed his happiness to make his debut. After making three appearances for the club, Blake made his return to his parent club. Despite rumors that Blake may returned to Mansfield Town on loan for the second time, this was played down by manager Paul Cox.

After his loan spell at Mansfield Town came to an end, Blake continued playing in the club's reserve until being released by the club at the end of the 2014–15 season.

Minnesota United
On 26 May 2016, Minnesota United announced that Blake had signed with the North American Soccer League club. Seven days later on 2 June 2016, Blake scored his first Minnesota United debut (and his first professional goal) in the third round of US Open, winning 3–0 against Saint Louis.

Jacksonville Armada
On 18 January 2017, it was reported that the Jacksonville Armada had signed Blake ahead of the NASL's 2017 season. Blake was named the NASL's Young Player of the Year after recording nine goals and four assists with the Armada.

Tampa Bay Rowdies
On 8 February 2018, the Tampa Bay Rowdies announced they had received Blake on a season-long loan from Jacksonville. A little over a month later, on 15 March 2018, he terminated his Armada FC contact, and joined the Rowdies on a permanent basis.

On 19 June 2018, Blake moved on loan to Utah-based USL side Real Monarchs.

Real Monarchs
Blake's moved to Salt Lake permanently ahead of their 2019 season, going on to captain Real Monarchs during their 2019 season. He re-signed with the club on 18 December 2019 for the 2020 season. He announced his departure from the club in December 2020.

San Diego Loyal
On 14 December 2019, Blake signed with USL Championship side San Diego Loyal.

Indy Eleven
After two seasons in San Diego, Blake moved to USL Championship club Indy Eleven on 6 January 2023.

International career
Though he was born in Nottingham, England, Blake is eligible to play for Scotland through his Scottish grandfather. In September 2011, Blake was called up by Scotland U19 and went on to make five appearances for the team.

Personal life
Blake earned his U.S. green card in 2019. His status also qualifies him as a domestic player for MLS roster purposes.

Career statistics

Club

References

External links
Scotland Profile at Scottish FA

1994 births
Living people
Footballers from Nottingham
Association football midfielders
English footballers
Scottish footballers
Scotland youth international footballers
Nottingham Forest F.C. players
Mansfield Town F.C. players
Minnesota United FC (2010–2016) players
Jacksonville Armada FC players
Tampa Bay Rowdies players
Real Monarchs players
San Diego Loyal SC players
Indy Eleven players
English Football League players
North American Soccer League players
USL Championship players
Scottish expatriate sportspeople in the United States
Expatriate soccer players in the United States
Scottish expatriate footballers
English expatriate sportspeople in the United States
English expatriate footballers